The Squiz was an Australian television game show, with the questions emphasising on sports. It aired on SBS One on Saturday nights at 8.30 pm. It made its debut on 23 May 2009 and was hosted by comedian Anh Do. However, the show was cancelled after one thirteen-show season.

The show consisted of two teams, one captained by  Amelia Jane Hunter, and the other by  Jordan Raskopoulos, both of whom are top comedians. Both have two guests in each team, mainly sports stars and up and coming comedians.

Hosts
 Anh Do – host
 Amelia Jane Hunter – team captain
 Jordan Raskopoulos – team captain

References

External links
 http://www.sbs.com.au/shows/thesquiz/about/page/i/1/h/About/

Special Broadcasting Service original programming
2009 Australian television series debuts
2000s Australian game shows